Nikolskoye is a rural locality (a village) in Ilyino-Polyansky Selsoviet, Blagoveshchensky District, Bashkortostan, Russia. The population was 3 as of 2010. There is 1 street.

Geography 
Nikolskoye is located 29 km northeast of Blagoveshchensk (the district's administrative centre) by road. Pokrovskoye is the nearest rural locality.

References 

Rural localities in Blagoveshchensky District